Joshua Wise (born February 7, 1983) is an American former professional stock car racing driver and currently an athletic trainer for Chip Ganassi Racing. He began racing in open wheel cars. Wise won the 1999 USAC 3/4 Midget Division, 2005 USAC National Midget Series, and the 2006 USAC Sprint Car Series championships.

He then switched to stock car racing in NASCAR. Wise's NASCAR Xfinity Series career included stints with Baker Curb Racing, Turner Motorsports, JR Motorsports and TMG. In the NASCAR Sprint Cup Series, he drove for Front Row Motorsports, Phil Parsons Racing and The Motorsports Group among others.

Early career
Wise started racing quarter midgets in Southern California with the Pomona Valley Quarter Midget Racing Association in 1991 when he was 8 years old. He won the California State Monza Championships in 1993, 1994, and 1996. He became a national quarter midget champion in 1994, winning the light B class at the Sacramento California Grand Nationals. In six years of racing quarter midgets, Wise won more than 60 races.

In 1997, Wise began racing micro sprints, he primarily competed at Barona Speedway near San Diego, but traveled to Northern California as well to compete. His rookie season at Barona Speedway, Wise captured eight main event wins, six of them in a row, finishing second in points, earning rookie of the year honors. In the 1998 season, Wise won five main events and the 250 Micro Midget Championship at Barona Speedway.

In 1999, Wise entered into the United States Auto Club (USAC) at 16 years of age in USAC's 3/4 Midget Division. He won the USAC Championship, earning four wins at Irwindale Speedway along with rookie of the year honors. This championship made Josh the youngest champion in USAC history, in 44 years of sanctioned races.

For 2000, Wise made the move to USAC's Western States Midget Division, racing only the pavement events. In his rookie year Wise captured two wins at Madera Speedway and one at Stockton 99, beating midget legend Sleepy Tripp to the checkers. For his first win at Madera Speedway, Wise started last and came through the field to take the win in a race that was called short due to a bad accident during the feature.

In 2003 Wise was hired by Tony Stewart after winning the Belleville Nationals and 360 Sprint Car non-wing Nationals on back to back weekends. Wise would win the USAC National Midget title in 2005, and National Sprint Car title in 2006 while driving for Stewart. Wise would also win 2 USAC Super license Championships in the same years.

Wise first appeared in the ARCA Re/MAX Series in 2006 with Eddie Sharp Racing. He ran two races and earned one top 10. In 2007, Wise returned to the team to run 11 races, earning one pole position and six top 10s, including three second-place finishes.

NASCAR

In 2007, it was announced that Wise would drive part-time for Darrell Waltrip Motorsports in conjunction with Michael Waltrip Racing. In nine races in the No. 00 Aaron's, Inc. Toyota, Wise earned two top 10s, including a career best sixth, at Las Vegas Motor Speedway.

In 2007, Wise made his Nationwide Series debut, at Indianapolis Raceway Park (IRP). Driving the No. 22 Family Dollar Dodge for Fitz Motorsports, he started 29th and finished on the lead lap in 17th. In 2008, he ran 17 races in the No. 22 Supercuts Dodge for Fitz and the No. 00 NAPA Auto Parts Toyota for Michael Waltrip Racing.

He earned one top 10 finish, a fifth-place finish at IRP. Wise made three series starts in 2009 for Xxxtreme Motorsport, failing to finish any of them. In 2009 Wise also raced 17 USAC sprint car races winning one race and getting 12 top fives. Wise raced 15 USAC national midget races winning three and taking eight top fives. Wins included the Belleville Nationals preliminary night and the Firemans Nationals.

After the 2009 season, it was announced that Wise had signed with Specialty Racing to run full-time in 2010. After seven races, he caught the eye of car owner Dale Earnhardt Jr. and was hired to drive for JR Motorsports part-time. He raced in the No. 7 JR Motorsports Chevy with sponsorship from Go Daddy and HowDoYou.com part-time through 2010 and in 2011, splitting the ride with IndyCar Series driver Danica Patrick; his average finish was 13th and he completed every race on the lead lap.

In 2011, Wise returned to JR Motorsports part-time and also drove for Go Green Racing and Key Motorsports. Wise raced part-time in 2011 bouncing between three different teams but  still managed to finish 16th in the Nationwide Series drivers standings, He also made his Cup Series debut at Chicago, driving for Max Q Motorsports; he qualified for three additional races over the rest of the year. In 2012, Wise ran the majority of the Nationwide Series schedule for The Motorsports Group. He also competed full-time, except for the Daytona 500, in the Sprint Cup Series, competing for rookie of the year, driving the Front Row Motorsports No. 26. Wise mostly ran the 26 as a start and park entry and finished behind Stephen Leicht in ROTY standings.

In 2013, Wise returned to Front Row Motorsports with the No. 26 renumbered to 35, driving all the races except Watkins Glen where Michael McDowell drove.  Wise drove about 20 races to completion, while start and parking the remainder.

On November 26, 2013, Wise announced that he had left Front Row Motorsports; on December 4 it was revealed that he would drive for Phil Parsons Racing in the 2014 NASCAR Sprint Cup Series season. He started 2014 off with a 24th-place finish in the Daytona 500, before failing to qualify at Phoenix. He qualified the following week at Las Vegas, finishing 42nd.

In 2015, Wise received sponsorship for the Daytona 500 from former Phoenix Racing owner James Finch's company Phoenix Construction. However, he failed to qualify after suffering from a mechanical failure at the start of the second Budweiser Duel. By the GEICO 500, the team had struggled, and was ranked 42nd in owners points, though Wise recorded his first career top-ten in the race.

On April 29, rumors arose that PPR and Jay Robinson had agreed to a deal that would send Wise to Robinson's Premium Motorsports; this was officially announced by Premium Motorsports on May 4. Wise officially joined Premium Motorsports at the Coca-Cola 600 weekend. This partnership was short-lived, however, as Wise parted ways with the team after the 2015 Quaker State 400. On July 17, Wise announced he had joined Go FAS Racing in the No. 32 for the Brickyard 400; however, Wise failed to qualify.  Wise returned to the No. 32 for a three-race stretch beginning at Michigan, where he was able to qualify and finish 37th and 35th, before failing to qualify for the Southern 500. Wise returned to Front Row Motorsports for the CampingWorld.com 500 at Talladega, driving the No. 34; he finished 29th in the event.

In 2016, Wise was picked up by The Motorsports Group for the Daytona 500; despite failing to qualify for the race, Wise and TMG announced their intention to run the full season together.  Wise has also failed to qualify for the GEICO 500 at Talladega, the Brickyard 400, and the Coke Zero 400 at Daytona, but have otherwise qualified for every race in 2016. He didn't drive for Martinsville, Phoenix, and Homestead as Gray Gaulding drove for the team at those races.

Dogecoin sponsorship

On March 16, 2014, users of a Reddit message board, /r/NASCAR, noticed Wise racing an unsponsored car at the Food City 500 and went with the idea of sponsoring a car. A user reached out to the Dogecoin community, a cryptocurrency based on the Internet meme, Doge, that had raised funds for other various causes. Phil Parsons Racing told /r/NASCAR the communities needed to raise $55,000 to sponsor Wise at the Aaron's 499, or just over 67 million Dogecoins. The money was raised in just over a week. Wise ran with the Dogecoin-wrapped car on May 4 in the Aaron's 499, running as high as fourth and finishing 20th, his second-best finish at the time.

Several days later Wise announced to his followers that he would race the Dogecar (also called the "Moonrocket") for free at the 2014 Sprint Showdown on May 16 and the 2014 All-Star Race if he won the Showdown or the fan vote. Wise did not advance through the Showdown but won the fan vote, defeating favorite Danica Patrick. Wise placed 15th in the exhibition All-Star Race. PPR earned an additional $120,000 for the weekend, which they said would be used to purchase newer, more competitive tires for their cars.

In 2015, the Dogecar returned for the Toyota/Save Mart 350.

Driver training
Wise no longer races in NASCAR and has declared himself to be retired. He eventually formed a driver performance consulting business, partnering with Chip Ganassi Racing in 2017 to train CGR drivers Brennan Poole, Tyler Reddick, Jamie McMurray and Kyle Larson. He currently serves as a driver performance manager for Chevrolet teams CGR, GMS Racing, and Hendrick Motorsports. Wise won the USAC Midget race at Lucas Oil Raceway on August 14, 2021 driving for Alex Bowman. The one-off start was his first series win since Angell Park Speedway in 2009.

Personal life
Wise has two daughters. He is a triathlete, beginning after cycling with driver Scott Speed, and occasionally tests his bicycle at the A2 Wind Tunnel in North Carolina.  Wise took to triathlon competitively and competed in a full 140.6 mile triathlon and four 70.3 mile Ironman triathlons. In 2015, Wise qualified for the Ironman 70.3 World Championships in Zell am See, Austria.

In 2014 Wise won a half marathon in Naples, FL.

Motorsports career results

NASCAR
(key) (Bold – Pole position awarded by qualifying time. Italics – Pole position earned by points standings or practice time. * – Most laps led.)

Sprint Cup Series

Daytona 500

Xfinity Series

Camping World Truck Series

Busch East Series

ARCA Re/Max Series
(key) (Bold – Pole position awarded by qualifying time. Italics – Pole position earned by points standings or practice time. * – Most laps led.)

 Season still in progress
 Ineligible for series points

References

External links

Living people
1983 births
Sportspeople from Riverside, California
Racing drivers from California
NASCAR drivers
ARCA Menards Series drivers
American male triathletes
Michael Waltrip Racing drivers
USAC Silver Crown Series drivers
JR Motorsports drivers